The Russian Orthodox Church (ROC), alternatively legally known as the Moscow Patriarchate, is an autocephalous Eastern Orthodox Christian church. It has 194 dioceses inside Russia. The primate of the ROC is the Patriarch of Moscow and all Rus'.

The Christianization of Kievan Rus' commenced in 988 with the baptism of the Rus' Grand Prince of Kiev — Vladimir the Great — and his people by the clergy of the Ecumenical Patriarch of Constantinople. The ecclesiastical title of Metropolitan of Kiev and all Rus' remained in the jurisdiction of the Ecumenical Patriarchate until 1686.

The ROC currently claims exclusive jurisdiction over the Eastern Orthodox Christians, irrespective of their ethnic background, who reside in the former member republics of the Soviet Union, excluding Georgia. The ROC also created the autonomous Church of Japan and Chinese Orthodox Church. The ROC eparchies in Belarus and Latvia, since the fall of the Soviet Union in the 1990s, enjoy various degrees of self-government, albeit short of the status of formal ecclesiastical autonomy.

The ROC should also not be confused with the Russian Orthodox Church Outside of Russia (or ROCOR, also known as the Russian Orthodox Church Abroad), headquartered in the United States. The ROCOR was instituted in the 1920s by Russian communities outside the Soviet Union, which had refused to recognise the authority of the Moscow Patriarchate that was de facto headed by Metropolitan Sergius Stragorodsky. The two churches reconciled on 17 May 2007; the ROCOR is now a self-governing part of the Russian Orthodox Church.

History

Kievan Rus'

The Christian community that developed into what is now known as the Russian Orthodox Church is traditionally said to have been founded by the Apostle Andrew, who is thought to have visited Scythia and Greek colonies along the northern coast of the Black Sea. According to one of the legends, Andrew reached the future location of Kiev and foretold the foundation of a great Christian city. The spot where he reportedly erected a cross is now marked by St. Andrew's Cathedral.

Transfer of the see to Moscow; de facto independence of the Moscow Church

As Kiev was losing its political, cultural, and economical significance due to the Mongol invasion, Metropolitan Maximus moved to Vladimir in 1299; his successor, Metropolitan Peter moved the residence to Moscow in 1325.

In 1439, at the Council of Florence, some Orthodox hierarchs from Byzantium as well as Metropolitan Isidore, who represented the Russian Church, signed a union with the Roman Church, whereby the Eastern Church would recognise the primacy of the Pope. However, the Moscow Prince Vasili II rejected the act of the Council of Florence brought to Moscow by Isidore in March 1441. Isidore was in the same year removed from his position as an apostate and expelled from Moscow. The Russian metropolitanate remained effectively vacant for the next few years due largely to the dominance of Uniates in Constantinople then. In December 1448, Jonas, a Russian bishop, was installed by the Council of Russian bishops in Moscow as Metropolitan of Kiev and All Russia (with permanent residence in Moscow) without the consent from Constantinople. This occurred five years prior to the fall of Constantinople in 1453 and, unintentionally, signified the beginning of an effectively independent church structure in the Moscow (North-Eastern Russian) part of the Russian Church. Subsequently, there developed a theory in Moscow that saw Moscow as the Third Rome, the legitimate successor to Constantinople, and the Primate of the Moscow Church as head of all the Russian Church. Meanwhile, the newly established in 1458 Russian Orthodox (initially Uniate) metropolitanate in Kiev (then in the Grand Duchy of Lithuania and subsequently in the Polish–Lithuanian Commonwealth) continued under the jurisdiction of the Ecumenical See until 1686, when it was provisionally transferred to the jurisdiction of Moscow.

Autocephaly and schism 

During the reign of Tsar Fyodor I, his brother-in-law, Boris Godunov, contacted the Ecumenical Patriarch of Constantinople, who "was much embarrassed for want of funds".

Several years after the Council of Pereyaslav (1654) that heralded the subsequent incorporation of eastern regions of the Polish–Lithuanian Commonwealth into the Tsardom of Russia, the see of the Metropolitan of Kiev and all Rus' was transferred to the Moscow Patriarchate (1686).

Peter the Great

Peter the Great (1682–1725) had an agenda of radical modernization of Russian government, army, dress and manners. He made Russia a formidable political power. Peter was not religious and had a low regard for the Church, so he put it under tight governmental control. He replaced the Patriarch with a Holy Synod, which he controlled. The Tsar appointed all bishops.  A clerical career was not a route chosen by upper-class society. Most parish priests were sons of priests, were very poorly educated, and very poorly paid. The monks in the monasteries had a slightly higher status; they were not allowed to marry. Politically, the church was impotent.  Catherine the Great later in the 18th century seized most of the church lands, and put the priests on a small salary supplemented by fees for services such as baptism and marriage.

Expansion

In the aftermath of the Treaty of Pereyaslav, the Ottomans (supposedly acting on behalf of the Russian regent Sophia Alekseyevna) pressured the Patriarch of Constantinople into transferring the Metropolitan of Kiev and all Rus' from the jurisdiction of Constantinople to that of Moscow. The handover brought millions of faithful and half a dozen dioceses under the ultimate administrative care of the Patriarch of Moscow and all Rus' (and later of the Holy Synod of Russia), leading to the significant Ukrainian presence in the Russian Church, which continued well into the 18th century, with Theophan Prokopovich, Epiphanius Slavinetsky, Stephen Yavorsky and Demetrius of Rostov being among the most notable representatives of this trend. The exact terms and conditions of the handover of the Kiev Metropolis are a contested issue.

In 1700, after Patriarch Adrian's death, Peter the Great prevented a successor from being named, and in 1721, following the advice of Theophan Prokopovich, Archbishop of Pskov, the Holy and Supreme Synod was established under Archbishop Stephen Yavorsky to govern the church instead of a single primate. This was the situation until shortly after the Russian Revolution of 1917, at which time the Local Council (more than half of its members being lay persons) adopted the decision to restore the Patriarchate. On 5 November (according to the Julian calendar) a new patriarch, Tikhon, was named through casting lots.

The late 18th century saw the rise of starchestvo under Paisiy Velichkovsky and his disciples at the Optina Monastery. This marked a beginning of a significant spiritual revival in the Russian Church after a lengthy period of modernization, personified by such figures as Demetrius of Rostov and Platon of Moscow. Aleksey Khomyakov, Ivan Kireevsky and other lay theologians with Slavophile leanings elaborated some key concepts of the renovated Orthodox doctrine, including that of sobornost. The resurgence of Eastern Orthodoxy was reflected in Russian literature, an example is the figure of Starets Zosima in Fyodor Dostoyevsky's Brothers Karamazov.

In the Russian Orthodox Church, the clergy, over time, formed a hereditary caste of priests. Marrying outside of these priestly families was strictly forbidden; indeed, some bishops did not even tolerate their clergy marrying outside of the priestly families of their diocese.

Fin-de-siècle religious renaissance

In 1909, a volume of essays appeared under the title Vekhi ("Milestones" or "Landmarks"), authored by a group of leading left-wing intellectuals, including Sergei Bulgakov, Peter Struve and former Marxists.

It is possible to see a similarly renewed vigor and variety in religious life and spirituality among the lower classes, especially after the upheavals of 1905. Among the peasantry, there was widespread interest in spiritual-ethical literature and non-conformist moral-spiritual movements, an upsurge in pilgrimage and other devotions to sacred spaces and objects (especially icons), persistent beliefs in the presence and power of the supernatural (apparitions, possession, walking-dead, demons, spirits, miracles and magic), the renewed vitality of local "ecclesial communities" actively shaping their own ritual and spiritual lives, sometimes in the absence of clergy, and defining their own sacred places and forms of piety. Also apparent was the proliferation of what the Orthodox establishment branded as "sectarianism", including both non-Eastern Orthodox Christian denominations, notably Baptists, and various forms of popular Orthodoxy and mysticism.

Russian Revolution and Civil War

In 1914, there were 55,173 Russian Orthodox churches and 29,593 chapels, 112,629 priests and deacons, 550 monasteries and 475 convents with a total of 95,259 monks and nuns in Russia.

The year 1917 was a major turning point in Russian history, and also the Russian Orthodox Church. In early March 1917 (O.S.), the Tsar was forced to abdicate, the Russian empire began to implode, and the government's direct control of the Church was all but over by August 1917. On 15 August (O.S.), in the Moscow Dormition Cathedral in the Kremlin, the Local (Pomestniy) Council of the ROC, the first such convention since the late 17th century, opened. The council continued its sessions until September 1918 and adopted a number of important reforms, including the restoration of Patriarchate, a decision taken 3 days after the Bolsheviks overthrew the Provisional Government in Petrograd on 25 October (O.S.). On 5 November, Metropolitan Tikhon of Moscow was selected as the first Russian Patriarch after about 200 years of Synodal rule.

In early February 1918, the Bolshevik-controlled government of Soviet Russia enacted the Decree on separation of church from state and school from church that proclaimed separation of church and state in Russia, freedom to "profess any religion or profess none", deprived religious organisations of the right to own any property and legal status. Legal religious activity in the territories controlled by Bolsheviks was effectively reduced to services and sermons inside church buildings. The Decree and attempts by Bolshevik officials to requisition church property caused sharp resentment on the part of the ROC clergy and provoked violent clashes on some occasions: on 1 February (19 January O.S.), hours after the bloody confrontation in Petrograd's Alexander Nevsky Lavra between the Bolsheviks trying to take control of the monastery's premises and the believers, Patriarch Tikhon issued a proclamation that anathematised the perpetrators of such acts.

The church was caught in the crossfire of the Russian Civil War that began later in 1918, and church leadership, despite their attempts to be politically neutral (from the autumn of 1918), as well as the clergy generally were perceived by the Soviet authorities as a "counter-revolutionary" force and thus subject to suppression and eventual liquidation.

In the first five years after the Bolshevik revolution, 28 bishops and 1,200 priests were executed.

Under Soviet rule

The Soviet Union, formally created in December 1922, was the first state to have elimination of religion as an ideological objective espoused by the country's ruling political party. Toward that end, the Communist regime confiscated church property, ridiculed religion, harassed believers, and propagated materialism and atheism in schools. Actions toward particular religions, however, were determined by State interests, and most organized religions were never outlawed.

Orthodox clergy and active believers were treated by the Soviet law-enforcement apparatus as anti-revolutionary elements and were habitually subjected to formal prosecutions on political charges, arrests, exiles, imprisonment in camps, and later could also be incarcerated in mental hospitals.

However, the Soviet policy vis-a-vis organised religion vacillated over time between, on the one hand, a utopian determination to substitute secular rationalism for what they considered to be an outmoded "superstitious" worldview and, on the other, pragmatic acceptance of the tenaciousness of religious faith and institutions. In any case, religious beliefs and practices did persist, not only in the domestic and private spheres but also in the scattered public spaces allowed by a state that recognized its failure to eradicate religion and the political dangers of an unrelenting culture war.

The Russian Orthodox church was drastically weakened in May 1922, when the Renovated (Living) Church, a reformist movement backed by the Soviet secret police, broke away from Patriarch Tikhon (also see the Josephites and the Russian True Orthodox Church), a move that caused division among clergy and faithful that persisted until 1946.

Between 1917 and 1935, 130,000 Eastern Orthodox priests were arrested. Of these, 95,000 were put to death. Many thousands of victims of persecution became recognized in a special canon of saints known as the "new martyrs and confessors of Russia".

When Patriarch Tikhon died in 1925, the Soviet authorities forbade patriarchal election. Patriarchal locum tenens (acting Patriarch) Metropolitan Sergius (Stragorodsky, 1887–1944), going against the opinion of a major part of the church's parishes, in 1927 issued a declaration accepting the Soviet authority over the church as legitimate, pledging the church's cooperation with the government and condemning political dissent within the church. By this declaration, Sergius granted himself authority that he, being a deputy of imprisoned Metropolitan Peter and acting against his will, had no right to assume according to the XXXIV Apostolic canon, which led to a split with the Russian Orthodox Church Outside Russia abroad and the Russian True Orthodox Church (Russian Catacomb Church) within the Soviet Union, as they allegedly remained faithful to the Canons of the Apostles, declaring the part of the church led by Metropolitan Sergius schism, sometimes coined Sergianism. Due to this canonical disagreement it is disputed which church has been the legitimate successor to the Russian Orthodox Church that had existed before 1925.<ref>{{Cite web|url=http://catacomb.org.ua/modules.php?name=Pages&go=page&pid=1099|title=Церковные Ведомости: Духовное наследие Катакомбной Церкви и Русской Православной Церкви Заграницей - Patriarch Tikhon''s Catacomb Church. History of the Russian True Orthodox Church|website=catacomb.org.ua|accessdate=25 December 2022}}</ref>

In 1927, Metropolitan Eulogius (Georgiyevsky) of Paris broke with the ROCOR (along with Metropolitan Platon (Rozhdestvensky) of New York, leader of the Russian Metropolia in America). In 1930, after taking part in a prayer service in London in supplication for Christians suffering under the Soviets, Evlogy was removed from office by Sergius and replaced. Most of Evlogy's parishes in Western Europe remained loyal to him; Evlogy then petitioned Ecumenical Patriarch Photius II to be received under his canonical care and was received in 1931, making a number of parishes of Russian Orthodox Christians outside Russia, especially in Western Europe an Exarchate of the Ecumenical Patriarchate as the Archdiocese of Russian Orthodox churches in Western Europe.

Moreover, in the 1929 elections, the Orthodox Church attempted to formulate itself as a full-scale opposition group to the Communist Party, and attempted to run candidates of its own against the Communist candidates. Article 124 of the 1936 Soviet Constitution officially allowed for freedom of religion within the Soviet Union, and along with initial statements of it being a multi-candidate election, the Church again attempted to run its own religious candidates in the 1937 elections. However the support of multicandidate elections was retracted several months before the elections were held and in neither 1929 nor 1937 were any candidates of the Orthodox Church elected.

After Nazi Germany's attack on the Soviet Union in 1941, Joseph Stalin revived the Russian Orthodox Church to intensify patriotic support for the war effort. In the early hours of 5 September 1943, Metropolitans Sergius (Stragorodsky), Alexius (Simansky) and Nicholas (Yarushevich) had a meeting with Stalin and received permission to convene a council on 8 September 1943, which elected Sergius Patriarch of Moscow and all the Rus'. This is considered by some as violation of the XXX Apostolic canon, as no church hierarch could be consecrated by secular authorities. A new patriarch was elected, theological schools were opened, and thousands of churches began to function. The Moscow Theological Academy Seminary, which had been closed since 1918, was re-opened.

In December 2017, the Security Service of Ukraine lifted classified top secret status of documents revealing that the NKVD of the USSR and its units were engaged in the selection of candidates for participation in the 1945 Local Council from the representatives of the clergy and the laity. NKVD demanded "to outline persons who have religious authority among the clergy and believers, and at the same time checked for civic or patriotic work". In the letter sent in September 1944, it was emphasized: "It is important to ensure that the number of nominated candidates is dominated by the agents of the NKBD, capable of holding the line that we need at the Council".

Persecution under Khrushchev
A new and widespread persecution of the church was subsequently instituted under the leadership of Nikita Khrushchev and Leonid Brezhnev. A second round of repression, harassment and church closures took place between 1959 and 1964 when Nikita Khrushchev was in office. The number of Orthodox churches fell from around 22,000 in 1959 to around 8,000 in 1965; priests, monks and faithful were killed or imprisoned and the number of functioning monasteries was reduced to less than twenty.

Subsequent to Khrushchev's overthrow, the Church and the government remained on unfriendly terms until 1988. In practice, the most important aspect of this conflict was that openly religious people could not join the Communist Party of the Soviet Union, which meant that they could not hold any political office. However, among the general population, large numbers remained religious.

Some Orthodox believers and even priests took part in the dissident movement and became prisoners of conscience. The Orthodox priests Gleb Yakunin, Sergiy Zheludkov and others spent years in Soviet prisons and exile for their efforts in defending freedom of worship. Among the prominent figures of that time were Dmitri Dudko and Aleksandr Men. Although he tried to keep away from practical work of the dissident movement intending to better fulfil his calling as a priest, there was a spiritual link between Men and many of the dissidents. For some of them he was a friend; for others, a godfather; for many (including Yakunin), a spiritual father.

By 1987 the number of functioning churches in the Soviet Union had fallen to 6,893 and the number of functioning monasteries to just 18. In 1987 in the Russian SFSR, between 40% and 50% of newborn babies (depending on the region) were baptized. Over 60% of all deceased received Christian funeral services.

 Glasnost and evidence of collaboration with the KGB 

Beginning  in the late 1980s, under Mikhail Gorbachev, the new political and social freedoms resulted in the return of many church buildings to the church, so they could be restored by local parishioners. A pivotal point in the history of the Russian Orthodox Church came in 1988, the millennial anniversary of the Christianization of Kievan Rus'. Throughout the summer of that year, major government-supported celebrations took place in Moscow and other cities; many older churches and some monasteries were reopened. An implicit ban on religious propaganda on state TV was finally lifted. For the first time in the history of the Soviet Union, people could watch live transmissions of church services on television.

Gleb Yakunin, a critic of the Moscow Patriarchate who was one of those who briefly gained access to the KGB's archives in the early 1990s, argued that the Moscow Patriarchate was "practically a subsidiary, a sister company of the KGB". Critics charge that the archives showed the extent of active participation of the top ROC hierarchs in the KGB efforts overseas.Yevgenia Albats and Catherine A. Fitzpatrick. The State Within a State: The KGB and Its Hold on Russia – Past, Present, and Future. 1994. , p. 46.Confirmed: Russian Patriarch Worked with KGB, Catholic World News. Retrieved 29 December 2007. George Trofimoff, the highest-ranking US military officer ever indicted for, and convicted of, espionage by the United States and sentenced to life imprisonment on 27 September 2001, had been "recruited into the service of the KGB" by Igor Susemihl (a.k.a. Zuzemihl), a bishop in the Russian Orthodox Church (subsequently, a high-ranking hierarch—the ROC Metropolitan Iriney of Vienna, who died in July 1999).

Konstanin Kharchev, former chairman of the Soviet Council on Religious Affairs, explained: "Not a single candidate for the office of bishop or any other high-ranking office, much less a member of the Holy Synod, went through without confirmation by the Central Committee of the CPSU and the KGB". Professor Nathaniel Davis points out: "If the bishops wished to defend their people and survive in office, they had to collaborate to some degree with the KGB, with the commissioners of the Council for Religious Affairs, and with other party and governmental authorities". Patriarch Alexy II, acknowledged that compromises were made with the Soviet government by bishops of the Moscow Patriarchate, himself included, and he publicly repented for these compromises.History of the Russian Orthodox Church Abroad , by St. John (Maximovich) of Shanghai and San Francisco, 31 December 2007

Post-Soviet era
Patriarch Aleksey II (1990–2008)

Metropolitan Alexy (Ridiger) of Leningrad, ascended the patriarchal throne in 1990 and presided over the partial return of Orthodox Christianity to Russian society after 70 years of repression, transforming the ROC to something resembling its pre-communist appearance; some 15,000 churches had been re-opened or built by the end of his tenure, and the process of recovery and rebuilding has continued under his successor Patriarch Kirill. According to official figures, in 2016 the Church had 174 dioceses, 361 bishops, and 34,764 parishes served by 39,800 clergy. There were 926 monasteries and 30 theological schools.

The Russian Church also sought to fill the ideological vacuum left by the collapse of Communism and even, in the opinion of some analysts, became "a separate branch of power".

In August 2000, the ROC adopted its Basis of the Social Concept and in July 2008, its Basic Teaching on Human Dignity, Freedom and Rights.

Under Patriarch Aleksey, there were difficulties in the relationship between the Russian Orthodox Church and the Vatican, especially since 2002, when Pope John Paul II created a Catholic diocesan structure for Russian territory. The leaders of the Russian Church saw this action as a throwback to prior attempts by the Vatican to proselytize the Russian Orthodox faithful to become Roman Catholic. This point of view was based upon the stance of the Russian Orthodox Church (and the Eastern Orthodox Church) that the Church of Rome is in schism, after breaking off from the Orthodox Church. The Roman Catholic Church, on the other hand, while acknowledging the primacy of the Russian Orthodox Church in Russia, believed that the small Roman Catholic minority in Russia, in continuous existence since at least the 18th century, should be served by a fully developed church hierarchy with a presence and status in Russia, just as the Russian Orthodox Church is present in other countries (including constructing a cathedral in Rome, near the Vatican).

There occurred strident conflicts with the Ecumenical Patriarchate, most notably over the Orthodox Church in Estonia in the mid-1990s, which resulted in unilateral suspension of eucharistic relationship between the churches by the ROC. The tension lingered on and could be observed at the meeting in Ravenna in early October 2007 of participants in the Orthodox–Catholic Dialogue: the representative of the Moscow Patriarchate, Bishop Hilarion Alfeyev, walked out of the meeting due to the presence of representatives from the Estonian Apostolic Orthodox Church which is in the jurisdiction of the Ecumenical Patriarchate. At the meeting, prior to the departure of the Russian delegation, there were also substantive disagreements about the wording of a proposed joint statement among the Orthodox representatives. After the departure of the Russian delegation, the remaining Orthodox delegates approved the form which had been advocated by the representatives of the Ecumenical Patriarchate. The Ecumenical See's representative in Ravenna said that Hilarion's position "should be seen as an expression of authoritarianism whose goal is to exhibit the influence of the Moscow Church. But like last year in Belgrade, all Moscow achieved was to isolate itself once more since no other Orthodox Church followed its lead, remaining instead faithful to Constantinople."

Canon Michael Bourdeaux, former president of the Keston Institute, said in January 2008 that "the Moscow Patriarchate acts as though it heads a state church, while the few Orthodox clergy who oppose the church-state symbiosis face severe criticism, even loss of livelihood." Such a view is backed up by other observers of Russian political life. Clifford J. Levy of The New York Times wrote in April 2008: "Just as the government has tightened control over political life, so, too, has it intruded in matters of faith. The Kremlin's surrogates in many areas have turned the Russian Orthodox Church into a de facto official religion, warding off other Christian denominations that seem to offer the most significant competition for worshipers. [...] This close alliance between the government and the Russian Orthodox Church has become a defining characteristic of Mr. Putin's tenure, a mutually reinforcing choreography that is usually described here as working 'in symphony'."

Throughout Patriarch Alexy's reign, the massive program of costly restoration and reopening of devastated churches and monasteries (as well as the construction of new ones) was criticized for having eclipsed the church's principal mission of evangelizing.Ветряные мельницы православия Kommersant, 15 December 2008.

On 5 December 2008, the day of Patriarch Alexy's death, the Financial Times said: "While the church had been a force for liberal reform under the Soviet Union, it soon became a center of strength for conservatives and nationalists in the post-communist era. Alexei's death could well result in an even more conservative church."

Patriarch Kirill (since 2009)

On 27 January 2009, the ROC Local Council elected Metropolitan Kirill of Smolensk Patriarch of Moscow and All Rus′ by 508 votes out of a total of 700. He was enthroned on 1 February 2009.

Patriarch Kirill implemented reforms in the administrative structure of the Moscow Patriarchate: on 27 July 2011 the Holy Synod established the Central Asian Metropolitan District, reorganizing the structure of the Church in Tajikistan, Uzbekistan, Kyrgyzstan and Turkmenistan. In addition, on 6 October 2011, at the request of the Patriarch, the Holy Synod introduced the metropoly (Russian: митрополия, mitropoliya), administrative structure bringing together neighboring eparchies.

Under Patriarch Kirill, the ROC continued to maintain close ties with the Kremlin enjoying the patronage of president Vladimir Putin, who has sought to mobilize Russian Orthodoxy both inside and outside Russia. Patriarch Kirill endorsed Putin's election in 2012, referring in February to Putin's tenure in the 2000s as "God's miracle." Nevertheless, Russian inside sources were quoted in the autumn 2017 as saying that Putin's relationship with Patriarch Kirill had been deteriorating since 2014 due to the fact that the presidential administration had been misled by the Moscow Patriarchate as to the extent of support for pro-Russian uprising in eastern Ukraine; also, due to Kirill's personal unpopularity he had come to be viewed as a political liability.

Schism with Constantinople

In 2018, the Moscow Patriarchate's traditional rivalry with the Patriarchate of Constantinople, coupled with Moscow's anger over the decision to grant autocephaly to the Ukrainian church by the Ecumenical Patriarch, led the ROC to boycott the Holy Great Council that had been prepared by all the Orthodox Churches for decades.

The Holy Synod of the ROC, at its session on 15 October 2018, severed full communion with the Ecumenical Patriarchate of Constantinople. The decision was taken in response to the move made by the Patriarchate of Constantinople a few days prior that effectively ended the Moscow Patriarchate's jurisdiction over Ukraine and promised autocephaly to Ukraine, the ROC's and the Kremlin's fierce opposition notwithstanding.

While the Ecumenical Patriarchate finalised the establishment of the Orthodox Church of Ukraine on 5 January 2019, the ROC continued to claim that the only legitimate Orthodox jurisdiction in the country, was its branch. Under a law of Ukraine adopted at the end of 2018, the latter was required to change its official title so as to disclose its affiliation with the Russian Orthodox Church based in an "aggressor state". On 11 December 2019 the Supreme Court of Ukraine allowed the Ukrainian Orthodox Church of the Moscow Patriarchate (UOC-MP) to retain its name.

In October 2019, the ROC unilaterally severed communion with the Church of Greece following the latter's recognition of the Ukrainian autocephaly. On 3 November, Patriarch Kirill failed to commemorate the Primate of the Church of Greece, Archbishop Ieronymos II of Athens, during a liturgy in Moscow. Additionally, the ROC leadership imposed pilgrimage bans for its faithful in respect of a number of dioceses in Greece, including that of Athens.

On 8 November 2019, the Russian Orthodox Church announced that Patriarch Kirill would stop commemorating the Patriarch of Alexandria and all Africa after the latter and his Church recognized the OCU that same day.

On 27 September 2021, the ROC established a religious day of remembrance for all Eastern Orthodox Christians which were persecuted by the Soviet regime. This day is the 30 October.

Russian invasion of Ukraine, 2022

Metropolitan Onufriy of Kyiv, primate of the Ukrainian Orthodox Church (Moscow Patriarchate) (UOC-MP) called the war "a disaster" stating that "The Ukrainian and Russian peoples came out of the Dnieper Baptismal font, and the war between these peoples is a repetition of the sin of Cain, who killed his own brother out of envy. Such a war has no justification either from God or from people." He also appealed directly to Putin, asking for an immediate end to the "fratricidal war". In April 2022, after the Russian invasion, many UOC-MP parishes signaled their intention to switch allegiance to the Orthodox Church of Ukraine. The attitude and stance of Patriarch Kirill of Moscow to the war is one of the oft quoted reasons. The head of the Russian Orthodox Church in Lithuania, Metropolitan , called Patriarch Kirill's "political statements about the war" his "personal opinion." On 7 March 2022,   condemned the Russian invasion of Ukraine.

On 27 February 2022, a group of Russian Orthodox priests published an open letter calling for an end to the war and criticized the suppression of non-violent anti-war protests in Russia. On 6 March 2022, Russian Orthodox priest of Moscow Patriarchate's Kostroma Diocese was fined by Russian authorities for anti-war sermon and stressing the importance of the commandment “Thou shalt not kill.” 

Structure and organization

The ROC constituent parts in other than the Russian Federation countries of its exclusive jurisdiction such as Ukraine, Belarus et al., are legally registered as separate legal entities in accordance with the relevant legislation of those independent states.

Ecclesiastiacally, the ROC is organized in a hierarchical structure. The lowest level of organization, which normally would be a single ROC building and its attendees, headed by a priest who acts as Father superior (nastoyatel), constitute a parish (prihod). All parishes in a geographical region belong to an eparchy (—equivalent to a Western diocese). Eparchies are governed by bishops (episcop or архиерей, archiereus). There are 261 Russian Orthodox eparchies worldwide (June 2012).

Further, some eparchies may be organized into exarchates (currently the Belarusian exarchate), and since 2003 into metropolitan districts (митрополичий округ), such as the ROC eparchies in Kazakhstan and the Central Asia (Среднеазиатский митрополичий округ).

Since the early 1990s, the ROC eparchies in some newly independent states of the former USSR enjoy the status of self-governing Churches within the Moscow Patriarchate (which status, according to the ROC legal terminology, is distinct from the "autonomous" one): the Estonian Orthodox Church of Moscow Patriarchate, Latvian Orthodox Church, Moldovan Orthodox Church, Ukrainian Orthodox Church (Moscow Patriarchate) (UOC-MP), the last one being virtually fully independent in administrative matters. (Following Russia's 2014 Invasion of Ukraine, the UOC-MP—which held nearly a third of the ROC(MP)'s churches—began to fragment, particularly since 2019, with some separatist congregations leaving the ROC(MP) to join the newly independent Orthodox Church of Ukraine (OCU) despite strident objections from the Moscow Patriarchate and the Russian government.Liik, Kadri; Metodiev, Momchil; and Popescu, Nicu: "Defender of the faith? How Ukraine’s Orthodox split threatens Russia,"  May 30, 2019, policy brief, European Council on Foreign Relations, retrieved January 26, 2022)

Similar status, since 2007, is enjoyed by the Russian Orthodox Church Outside Russia (previously fully independent and deemed schismatic by the ROC). The Chinese Orthodox Church and the Japanese Orthodox Churches were granted full autonomy by the Moscow Patriarchate, but this autonomy is not universally recognized.

Smaller eparchies are usually governed by a single bishop. Larger eparchies, exarchates, and self-governing Churches are governed by a Metropolitan archbishop and sometimes also have one or more bishops assigned to them.

The highest level of authority in the ROC is vested in the Local Council (Pomestny Sobor), which comprises all the bishops as well as representatives from the clergy and laypersons. Another organ of power is the Bishops' Council (Архиерейский Собор). In the periods between the Councils the highest administrative powers are exercised by the Holy Synod of the Russian Orthodox Church, which includes seven permanent members and is chaired by the Patriarch of Moscow and All Russia, Primate of the Moscow Patriarchate.

Although the Patriarch of Moscow enjoys extensive administrative powers, unlike the Pope, he has no direct canonical jurisdiction outside the Urban Diocese of Moscow, nor does he have single-handed authority over matters pertaining to faith as well as issues concerning the entire Orthodox Christian community such as the Catholic-Orthodox split.

Orthodox Church in America (OCA)

The OCA has its origins in a mission established by eight Russian Orthodox monks in Alaska, then part of Russian America, in 1794. This grew into a full diocese of the Russian Orthodox Church after the United States purchased Alaska from Russia in 1867. By the late 19th century, the Russian Orthodox Church had grown in other areas of the United States due to the arrival of immigrants from areas of Eastern and Central Europe, many of them formerly of the Eastern Catholic Churches ("Greek Catholics"), and from the Middle East. These immigrants, regardless of nationality or ethnic background, were united under a single North American diocese of the Russian Orthodox Church.

During the Second World War, the Patriarchate of Moscow unsuccessfully attempted to regain control of the groups which were located abroad. After it resumed its communication with Moscow in the early 1960s, and after it was granted autocephaly in 1970, the Metropolia became known as the Orthodox Church in America.OrthodoxWiki. ROCOR and OCA . But its autocephalous status is not universally recognized. The Ecumenical Patriarch (who has jurisdiction over the Greek Orthodox Archdiocese of America) and some other jurisdictions have not officially accepted it. The Ecumenical Patriarch and the other jurisdictions remain in communion with the OCA. The Patriarchate of Moscow thereby renounced its former canonical claims in the United States and Canada; it also acknowledged the establishment of an autonomous church in Japan in 1970.

Russian Orthodox Church Outside Russia (ROCOR)

Russia's Church was devastated by the repercussions of the Bolshevik Revolution. One of its effects was a flood of refugees from Russia to the United States, Canada, and Europe. The Revolution of 1918 severed large sections of the Russian church—dioceses in America, Japan, and Manchuria, as well as refugees in Europe—from regular contacts with the main church.

On 28 December 2006, it was officially announced that the Act of Canonical Communion would finally be signed between the ROC and ROCOR. The signing took place on 17 May 2007, followed immediately by a full restoration of communion with the Moscow Patriarchate, celebrated by a Divine Liturgy at the Cathedral of Christ the Saviour in Moscow, at which the Patriarch of Moscow and All Russia Alexius II and the First Hierarch of ROCOR concelebrated for the first time.

Under the Act, the ROCOR remains a self-governing entity within the Church of Russia. It is independent in its administrative, pastoral, and property matters. It continues to be governed by its Council of Bishops and its Synod, the Council's permanent executive body. The First-Hierarch and bishops of the ROCOR are elected by its Council and confirmed by the Patriarch of Moscow. ROCOR bishops participate in the Council of Bishops of the entire Russian Church.

In response to the signing of the act of canonical communion, Bishop Agathangel (Pashkovsky) of Odessa and parishes and clergy in opposition to the Act broke communion with ROCOR, and established ROCA(A). Some others opposed to the Act have joined themselves to other Greek Old Calendarist groups.

Currently both the OCA and ROCOR, since 2007, are in communion with the ROC.

 Self-governing branches of the ROC 

The Russian Orthodox Church has four levels of self-government.

The autonomous churches which are part of the ROC are:

 Ukrainian Orthodox Church (Moscow Patriarchate), a special status autonomy close to autocephaly
 Self-governed churches (Estonia, Latvia, Moldova)
 Belarusian Orthodox Church, an exarchate
 Pakistan Orthodox Church
 Metropolitan District of Kazakhstan
 Japanese Orthodox Church
 Chinese Orthodox Church
 Archdiocese of Russian Orthodox churches in Western Europe

Although the Ukrainian Orthodox Church (Moscow Patriarchate) claims that ‘any provisions that at least somehow hinted at or indicated the connection with Moscow were excluded’ (following the 2022 Russian invasion of Ukraine) the Russian Orthodox Church ignores this and continues to include UOC-MP clerics in various commissions or working groups despite these individuals not agreeing to this nor even wanting to be included.

Worship and practices

Canonization

In accordance with the practice of the Orthodox Church, a particular hero of faith can initially be canonized only at a local level within local churches and eparchies. Such rights belong to the ruling hierarch and it can only happen when the blessing of the patriarch is received. The task of believers of the local eparchy is to record descriptions of miracles, to create the hagiography of a saint, to paint an icon, as well as to compose a liturgical text of a service where the saint is canonized. All of this is sent to the Synodal Commission for canonization which decides whether to canonize the local hero of faith or not. Then the patriarch gives his blessing and the local hierarch performs the act of canonization at the local level. However, the liturgical texts in honor of a saint are not published in all Church books but only in local publications. In the same way, these saints are not yet canonized and venerated by the whole Church, only locally. When the glorification of a saint exceeds the limits of an eparchy, then the patriarch and Holy Synod decides about their canonization on the Church level. After receiving the Synod's support and the patriarch's blessing, the question of glorification of a particular saint on the scale of the entire Church is given for consideration to the Local Council of the Russian Orthodox Church.

In the period following the revolution, and during the communist persecutions up to 1970, no canonizations took place. In 1970, the Holy Synod decided to canonize a missionary to Japan, Nicholas Kasatkin (1836–1912). In 1977, St. Innocent of Moscow (1797–1879), the Metropolitan of Siberia, the Far East, the Aleutian Islands, Alaska, and Moscow was also canonized. In 1978 it was proclaimed that the Russian Orthodox Church had created a prayer order for Meletius of Kharkov, which practically signified his canonization because that was the only possible way to do it at that time. Similarly, the saints of other Orthodox Churches were added to the Church calendar: in 1962 St. John the Russian, in 1970 St. Herman of Alaska, in 1993 Silouan the Athonite, the elder of Mount Athos, already canonized in 1987 by the Ecumenical Patriarchate of Constantinople. In the 1980s the Russian Orthodox Church re-established the process for canonization; a practice that had ceased for half a century.

In 1989, the Holy Synod established the Synodal Commission for canonization. The 1990 Local Council of the Russian Orthodox Church gave an order for the Synodal Commission for Canonisation to prepare documents for canonization of new martyrs who had suffered from the 20th century Communist repressions. In 1991 it was decided that a local commission for canonization would be established in every eparchy which would gather the local documents and would send them to the Synodal Commission. Its task was to study the local archives, collect memories of believers, record all the miracles that are connected with addressing the martyrs. In 1992 the Church established 25 January as a day when it venerates the new 20th century martyrs of faith. The day was specifically chosen because on this day in 1918 the Metropolitan of Kiev Vladimir (Bogoyavlensky) was killed, thus becoming the first victim of communist terror among the hierarchs of the Church.

During the 2000 Council of the Russian Orthodox Church, the greatest general canonization in the history of the Orthodox Church took place: not only regarding the number of saints but also as in this canonization, all unknown saints were mentioned. There were 1,765 canonized saints known by name and others unknown by name but "known to God".

Icon painting

The use and making of icons entered Kievan Rus' following its conversion to Orthodox Christianity in AD 988. As a general rule, these icons strictly followed models and formulas hallowed by Byzantine art, led from the capital in Constantinople. As time passed, the Russians widened the vocabulary of types and styles far beyond anything found elsewhere in the Orthodox world. Russian icons are typically paintings on wood, often small, though some in churches and monasteries may be much larger. Some Russian icons were made of copper. Many religious homes in Russia have icons hanging on the wall in the krasny ugol, the "red" or "beautiful" corner. There is a rich history and elaborate religious symbolism associated with icons. In Russian churches, the nave is typically separated from the sanctuary by an iconostasis (Russian ikonostas, иконостас), or icon-screen, a wall of icons with double doors in the centre. Russians sometimes speak of an icon as having been "written", because in the Russian language (like Greek, but unlike English) the same word (pisat, писать in Russian) means both to paint and to write. Icons are considered to be the Gospel in paint, and therefore careful attention is paid to ensure that the Gospel is faithfully and accurately conveyed. Icons considered miraculous were said to "appear." The "appearance" (Russian: yavlenie, явление) of an icon is its supposedly miraculous discovery. "A true icon is one that has 'appeared', a gift from above, one opening the way to the Prototype and able to perform miracles".

Bell ringing

Bell ringing, which has a history in the Russian Orthodox tradition dating back to the baptism of Rus', plays an important part in the traditions of the Russian Orthodox Church.

Ecumenism and interfaith relations

In May 2011, Hilarion Alfeyev, the Metropolitan of Volokolamsk and head of external relations for the Moscow Patriarchate of the Russian Orthodox Church, stated that Orthodox and Evangelical Christians share the same positions on "such issues as abortion, the family, and marriage" and desire "vigorous grassroots engagement" between the two Christian communions on such issues.

The Metropolitan also believes in the possibility of peaceful coexistence between Islam and Christianity because the two religions have never fought religious wars in Russia. Alfeyev stated that the Russian Orthodox Church "disagrees with atheist secularism in some areas very strongly" and "believes that it destroys something very essential about human life."

Today, the Russian Orthodox Church has ecclesiastical missions in Jerusalem and some other countries around the world.

 Membership 

The ROC is often said to be the largest of all of the Eastern Orthodox churches in the world. Including all the autocephalous churches under its supervision, its adherents number more than 112 million worldwide—about half of the 200 to 220 million estimated adherents of the Eastern Orthodox Church. Among Christian churches, the Russian Orthodox Church is only second to the Roman Catholic Church in terms of numbers of followers. Within Russia the results of a 2007 VTsIOM poll indicated that about 75% of the population considered itself Orthodox Christian. Up to 65% of ethnic Russians as well as Russian-speakers from Russia who are members of other ethnic groups (Ossetians, Chuvash, Caucasus Greeks etc.) and a similar percentage of Belarusians and Ukrainians identify themselves as "Orthodox". However, according to a poll published by the church related website   in December 2012, only 41% of the Russian population identified itself with the Russian Orthodox Church. Pravmir.com also published a 2012 poll by the respected Levada organization VTsIOM indicating that 74% of Russians considered themselves Orthodox. The 2017 Survey Religious Belief and National Belonging in Central and Eastern Europe made by the Pew Research Center showed that 71% of Russians declared themselves as Orthodox Christian, and in 2021, the Russian Public Opinion Research Center (VCIOM) estimated that 66% of Russians were Orthodox Christians.

 See also 
 Eparchies and Metropolitanates of the Russian Orthodox Church
 List of Slavic studies journals

 References 
Notes

 Citations 

 Sources 

 Tomos for Ukraine: rocking the Moscow foundation
 Russian Orthodox Church severs ties with Ecumenical Patriarchate

 Further reading Since 1991 Daniel, Wallace L. The Orthodox Church and Civil Society in Russia (2006) online.
 Evans, Geoffrey, and Ksenia Northmore‐Ball. "The Limits of Secularization? The Resurgence of Orthodoxy in Post‐Soviet Russia." Journal for the Scientific Study of Religion 51#4 (2012): 795–808. online
 Garrard, John and Carol Garrard. Russian Orthodoxy Resurgent: Faith and Power in the New Russia (2008). online
 Kahla, Elina. "Civil Religion in Russia." Baltic worlds: scholarly journal: news magazine (2014). online
 McGann, Leslie L. "The Russian Orthodox Church under Patriarch Aleksii II and the Russian State: An Unholy Alliance?." Demokratizatsiya 7#1 (1999): 12+ online
 Papkova, Irina. "The Russian Orthodox Church and political party platforms." Journal of Church and State (2007) 49#1: 117–34. online
 Papkova, Irina, and Dmitry P. Gorenburg. "The Russian Orthodox Church and Russian Politics: Editors' Introduction." Russian Politics & Law 49#1 (2011): 3–7. introduction to special issue
 Pankhurst, Jerry G., and Alar Kilp. "Religion, the Russian Nation and the State: Domestic and International Dimensions: An Introduction." Religion, State and Society 41.3 (2013): 226–43.
 Payne, Daniel P. "Spiritual security, the Russian Orthodox Church, and the Russian Foreign Ministry: collaboration or cooptation?." Journal of Church and State (2010): summary online
 Richters, Katja. The Post-Soviet Russian Orthodox Church: Politics, Culture and Greater Russia (2014)Historical Billington, James H. The Icon and the Axe: An Interpretative History of Russian Culture (1970)
 Bremer, Thomas. Cross and Kremlin: A Brief History of the Orthodox Church in Russia (2013)
 Cracraft, James. The Church Reform of Peter the Great (1971)
 Ellis, Jane. The Russian Orthodox Church: A Contemporary History (1988)
 Freeze, Gregory L. "Handmaiden of the state? The church in Imperial Russia reconsidered." Journal of Ecclesiastical History 36#1 (1985): 82–102.
 Freeze, Gregory L. "Subversive piety: Religion and the political crisis in late Imperial Russia." Journal of Modern History (1996): 308–50. in JSTOR
 Freeze, Gregory L. "The Orthodox Church and Serfdom in Prereform Russia." Slavic Review (1989): 361–87. in JSTOR
 Freeze, Gregory L. "Social Mobility and the Russian Parish Clergy in the Eighteenth Century." Slavic Review (1974): 641–62. in JSTOR
 Freeze, Gregory L. The Parish Clergy in Nineteenth-Century Russia: Crisis, Reform, Counter-Reform  (1983)
 Freeze, Gregory L. "A case of stunted Anticlericalism: Clergy and Society in Imperial Russia." European History Quarterly 13#.2 (1983): 177–200.
 Freeze, Gregory L. Russian Levites: Parish Clergy in the Eighteenth Century (1977)
 Gruber, Isaiah. Orthodox Russia in Crisis: Church and Nation in the Time of Troubles (2012); 17th century
 Hughes, Lindsey. Russia in the Age of Peter the Great (1998) pp. 332–56
 Kizenko, Nadieszda. A Prodigal Saint: Father John of Kronstadt and the Russian People (2000) This highly influential holy man lived 1829–1908.
 Kozelsky, Mara. Christianizing Crimea: Shaping Sacred Space in the Russian Empire and Beyond (2010).
 de Madariaga, Isabel. Russia in the Age of Catherine the Great (1981) pp. 111–22
 Mrowczynski-Van Allen, Artur, ed. Apology of Culture: Religion and Culture in Russian Thought (2015)
 Pipes, Richard. Russia under the Old Regime (2nd ed. 1976) ch 9
 Strickland, John. The Making of Holy Russia: The Orthodox Church and Russian Nationalism Before the Revolution (2013)Historiography' Freeze, Gregory L. "Recent Scholarship on Russian Orthodoxy: A Critique." Kritika: Explorations in Russian and Eurasian History'' 2#2 (2008): 269–78.

External links 

  
 Department for External Church Relations of the Russian Orthodox Church official website 
  
 Church of Russia at OrthodoxWiki 

 
Eastern Orthodoxy in Russia
1448 establishments
Eastern Orthodox Church bodies in Europe
Russia
Eastern Orthodoxy in Europe
Russia
Members of the World Council of Churches
Members of the National Council of Churches
15th-century establishments in Russia
State churches (Christian)
Russian culture
Christianity in Russia